Vejprty is a town in Chomutov District in the Ústí nad Labem Region of the Czech Republic. It has about 2,700 inhabitants. It lies along the border with Germany.

Administrative parts
Villages of České Hamry and Výsada are administrative parts of Vejprty.

Geography
It lies in the Ore Mountains. The territory stretches along the border with Germany, from which it is separated by the Polana stream. It borders the German municipalities of Bärenstein and Oberwiesenthal.

History
The first written mention of Vejprty is from 1506. In 1550, silver ore was discovered in the area. The mining settlement of Neugeschrei was established near the newly created adit, today the local part of Vejprty under the name Nové Zvolání. In 1607, Emperor Rudolf II allowed all the miners and craftsmen settled here to deal freely with their property. Vejprty was promoted to a royal mining town in 1617.

Vejprty was badly damaged during the Thirty Years' War by the army of Johan Banér, and the mines were flooded. In 1688, mining was resumed and the town began to flourish again. In the first half of the 18th century, however, profitability began to decline, and mining stopped in 1751. Although mining resumed briefly in the 19th century, it ended for good in 1845. The livelihood of the inhabitants was thus gradually reoriented to the manufacture of rifles and to lacemaking. Rapid development took place in the second half of the 19th century. It was helped by the establishment of the Chomutov–Vejprty railway, which was put into operation in 1872.

Notable people
Ottokar Tumlirz (1856–1928), Austrian physicist
Theodor Innitzer (1875–1955), cardinal and Archbishop of Vienna
Wilhelm Dick (1897–1980), German ski jumper
Viktor Petermann (1916–2001), German Luftwaffe fighter ace
Walter W. Müller (born 1933), German academic

Twin towns – sister cities

Vejprty is twinned with:
 Bärenstein, Germany

Vejprty also cooperates with Gunzenhausen, Germany.

Gallery

References

External links

Cities and towns in the Czech Republic
Populated places in Chomutov District
Czech Republic–Germany border